Patrick is a former rural locality in the Barcaldine Region, Queensland, Australia.

On 22 November 2019 the Queensland Government decided to amalgamate the localities in the Barcaldine Region, resulting in five expanded localities based on the larger towns: Alpha, Aramac, Barcaldine, Jericho and Muttaburra. Patrick was incorporated into Barcaldine.

Geography 
The Landsborough Highway passes through the location from the north (Barcaldine) to the south (Home Creek).

The Alice River forms the western boundary of the locality. Patrick Creek flows through the locality from east (Narbethong) to west, where it becomes a tributary of the Alice River.

The principal land use is grazing on native vegetation.

History 
The locality presumably takes its name from the creek, which in turn was named on 10 October 1861 by Frederick Walker during his expedition to rescue the Burke and Wills expedition. Patrick was Walker's Aboriginal assistant.

Schools 
There are no schools in Patrick. The nearest primary and secondary schools are in Barcaldine.

References 

Barcaldine Region
Unbounded localities in Queensland